Isidor Bajić Music School is a secondary school of music located in the city of Novi Sad, Vojvodina, Serbia. Specifically, it is located at Tsar Lazar Boulevard. The school was established on  September 1, 1909. It is one of the 15 secondary schools in Novi Sad. The school was named after Isidor Bajić, a famous Serbian composer, pedagogue, and publisher, who was also the school's first principal and instructor of theory.

History

Birth of the school
The school was founded by Isidor Bajić due to a growing need for more educated musicians in the Novi Sad community, as well the growing popularity for music of higher artistic level among the educated music audiences. Bajić himself was a teacher at both the Central Elementary School and the Big Serbian Orthodox Lyceum in Novi Sad (today known as Gymnasium “Jovan Jovanović Zmaj”), prepared sermons for the occasion of Saint Sava Day in the Lyceum, led three choirs and the singing society Neven, and collaborated on various musical aspects of Serbian National Theater productions. Realizing all of this, Isidor Bajić announced his intention to the public after an initial period of pondering, consulting, and planning:

Isidor Bajić Music School was launched officially on September 1, 1909.  Apart from the Music School in Subotica, the new school was at this time the only specialized music school in Serbia north of the Sava and Danube rivers. It quickly rose as a prominent and prestigious music school, attracting many professional musicians of that time to be part of the teaching staff.

The beginning of the First World War and the early death of Isidor Bajić interrupted this progress and resulted in a temporary closing of the School on 15 September 1915. The repercussions of the war resulted in a burdensome and slow reestablishment of the school in the following years.

Interwar period
In 1919 a question was put forth regarding the founding of an institution which could restore the musical activities of Novi Sad in the spirit of Isidor Bajić’s ideas. In 1920, upon the initiation of Vladimir Karakašević, the Music Society was founded with the aim of gathering music lovers from Novi Sad, amateurs as well as professionals, in order to improve the nation’s arts. Despite the serious efforts of the Music Society of Novi Sad management, the Isidor Bajić Music School started working again only in 1927, when it became the first half-state music school upon the approval of the Ministry of Education. Numerous problems accompanied and put in jeopardy the work of the School until 1930, when Svetolik Pašćan-Kojanov, a famous conductor, composer and music writer, became the School’s Principal. A period of renaissance followed in 1936 when Rikard Švarc was appointed Principal. By 1941, 210 pupils were enrolled in the school, but the successful work was again interrupted by the Second World War.

School relocation

After the Second World War, and upon the proposal of the Local Command Office of the Department of Education, Milutin Ružić was hired to organize and gather teachers so that Music School Isidor Bajić might again begin its work.  An experienced staff was joined with and strengthened by the addition younger colleagues, and many other diligent, highly professional, and devoted music pedagogues who ushered in a successful new period in the School’s operation. The number of students grew constantly, as did the number of teachers. With such prolific growth, the School soon faced the problem of finding premises large enough for all its classes to be taught. Though this issue remained relevant for several years, it was finally resolved in 1953 when the school was relocated to Njegoševa Street #9. When composer Rudolf Bruči became Principal of the School soon after, another period of constant improvement was born, resulting in 20 years of improved classes and student enrichment, and greater funds for instruments, records, and sheet music.

New school building
During the time of Principal Mr. Radmila Rakin Martinović, the music school finally moved from its old building (which was a temporary location) in Njegoševa Street in Star Grad neighborhood to its new building (built in 2011) at Tzar Lazar Boulevard along with the ballet school of Novi Sad (founded in 1947), where they share the same building and cooperate with each other. The new building provides a more quality education environment specifically tailored for musical and ballet arts. One of the schools concert halls are also used by the city during cultural events.

Educational levels and types
The School is divided into several educational levels depending on the age and musical proficiency:

Music Kindergarten (198 students) – duration: one to two years;
Elementary Music School (696 students) – duration: two to six years;
High Music School (238 students) – duration: four years;
The Futog Branch (73 students)
Part-time enrollment
ABRSM (Associated Board of the Royal Schools of Music), member since 2006

School departments
The School is divided into several musical departments:
Piano Department
String Department
Wind Department
Accordion Department
Voice Department
Poly-Instrumental Department
Music Theory Department

Principals

Isidor Bajić, 1909–1915
Jovan Mikšik
Svetolik Pašćan-Kojanov, 1930–1936
Rikard Schwarz, 1936–1941
Lajoš Kiš
Milutin Ružić
Hinko Marzinec
Anton Tot
Arsen Triva
Dušan Stular
Vera Tošić
Rudolf Bruči
Ivan Kovač
Mirjana Ivković
Ivan Buljovčić
Stevan Divjaković
Mr Radmila Rakin Martinović, 1996–

Productions
In recent decades, the school has produced recorded musical work (on cassette tape and CDs), as well as a historical book about music:
Audio Cassette,
"Karmina Burana" music CD from Karla Orfa in 1998, 
"120. godina od rođenja Isidora Bajića" music CD on 4 November 1999,  
"Muzika za Orkestar" and "Horska Muzika" music CDs on 16 May 2001, 
"Ljubav stvara bolji svet" of "Bajićevi slavuji" choir music CD in 2000, 
"Gudački orkestar M.Š. "Isidor Bajić"" music CD, 
Monograph "Novi Sad – a City of Music" by Marija Adamov, Zorana Kolundžije, and Mr Radmila Rakin Martinović in 27. June 2000.

Accolades
Students of the school have achieved success in music competitions in Serbia and abroad, averaging 100 awards per year, and receiving numerous awards for excellent performance and pedagogical achievements. One such example is the "Vuk Stefanovic Karadzic Award", received in 1999 from the Ministry of Education of the Republic of Serbia and Cultural and Educational Society of Serbia.

In 2004, the school and the principal received the New Millennium Award for the Best Trade Name in Madrid for successful work and management in the field of musical education and culture.

In 2007, it received the "Dr Đorđe Natošević" Award.

Events
The school hosts several musical events, competitions, and conferences:
Isidor Bajić Piano Memorial
Anton Eberst Competition
Horn Competition Isidor Bajić
World Piano Conference

Cooperation
The school cooperates with several organizations, cultural institutions, and musics schools, within Serbia and abroad.

Organizations:
European Music School Union (EMU) – member since 2006
Association of Music and Ballet Schools of Serbia
Associated Board of the Royal Schools of Music (ABRSM)
European Piano Teachers Association (EPTA)
EPTA Serbia
EPTA Voyvodina

Cultural Institutions:
Jeunesse Musicale of Novi Sad
Matica srpska
Cultural Center of Novi Sad
Center for Cultural Animation

Music Schools:
The music schools of Serbia
Vida Matjan Music School, Kotor, Crna Gora
Fran Korun-Kozeljski Music School, Velenje, Slovenija
Siklós State Music School, Siklós, Hungary
Mily Balakirev Music School, Moscow, Russia
Children’s Art School No 8, Nizhny Novgorod, Russia
Norfolk Music Service, Norwich, England
High School Svetozar Marković, Novi Sad, Serbia
Ballet School Novi Sad, Serbia (shares the same building)
School of Design Bogdan Šuput, Novi Sad, Serbia

Sister Schools:
Dr Miloje Milojević Music School, Kragujevac, Serbia

References

Citations

Sources

"Zastava", No. 94, Novi Sad, 15 May 1909.
"Zastava", No. 28, Novi Sad, 1913.
"Dan", Novi Sad, 27 April 1939.

External links
 

Music schools in Serbia
Educational institutions established in 1909
Education in Novi Sad
Schools in Vojvodina
Buildings and structures in Novi Sad